Federal Route 75, or Jalan Bagan Serai–Kuala Kurau, is a federal road in Kerian district, Perak, Malaysia that connects Bagan Serai in the east to Kuala Kurau in the west.

Route background 
The Kilometre Zero of the Federal Route 75 starts at Bagan Serai, at its interchange with the Federal Route 1, the main trunk road of the central of Peninsular Malaysia.

Features
At most sections, the Federal Route 75 was built under the JKR R5 road standard, with a speed limit of 90 km/h.

List of junctions and towns

References

Malaysian Federal Roads